North Westmeath was a constituency in Ireland, returning one Member of Parliament to the United Kingdom House of Commons from 1885 to 1918.

Prior to the 1885 general election and after the dissolution of parliament in 1918 the area was part of the Westmeath constituency.

Boundaries
This constituency comprised the northern part of County Westmeath.

1885–1918: The baronies of Corkaree, Delvin, Farbill and Fore, those parts of the baronies of Moyashel and Magheradernon and Moyguish not contained in the constituency of South Westmeath, and that part of the barony of Fartullagh contained within the parishes of Lynn, Moylisker and Mullingar.

Members of Parliament

1Joined the Irish Parliamentary Party during the parliamentary term

Elections

Elections in the 1880s

Elections in the 1890s

Elections in the 1900s

Elections in the 1910s

References

Westminster constituencies in County Westmeath (historic)
Constituencies of the Parliament of the United Kingdom established in 1885
Constituencies of the Parliament of the United Kingdom disestablished in 1918